Manju Sarkar (born 1 September 1953) is a Bangladeshi writer. He is the recipient of Bangla Academy Literary Award (1998).

Education and career
Sarkar studied in Kailash Ranjan High School and Carmichael College. He retired as the publication officer of Jatiya Granthakendra. He then worked as  an editor of the Amar Desh and The Daily Ittefaq.

Works
 Amosh (Darkness, 1984)
 Nagno Agontuk (The Naked Guest, 1986)
 Protima Upakkhyan (The Story of Protima, 1992)
 Danrabar Jaiga (Standing Room, 1994)
 Abashbhui(My Homeland, 1994)
 Bhangoner Somoy Bhalobasha (Love in Breaking Times, 1995)
 Mrita (Nectar, 1995)
 Swapnochore (The Dream-Thief, 1997).
 Shinduker Chabi (2009)

Awards
 Philips Award for literature
 Alaol Literary Award
 Agrani Bank Award for Children Literature
 Bogra Lekhak Chakra Award
 Bangla Academy Literary Award (1999)

References

Living people
1953 births
People from Rangpur District
Bangladeshi male writers